Heliophanus alienus is a jumping spider species in the genus Heliophanus.  It was described by Wanda Wesołowska in 1986 and is found in Cameroon.

References

Endemic fauna of Cameroon
Salticidae
Spiders of Africa
Arthropods of Cameroon
Spiders described in 1986
Taxa named by Wanda Wesołowska